Gassin is a commune in the Var department in the Provence-Alpes-Côte d'Azur region in southeastern France.

It is located very near to the holiday destination of Saint-Tropez. Many Tropezian tourists attracted by a more affordable life prefer to stay in Gassin and enjoy the same kind of "Cote d'Azur" life.

It lies 2 kilometres from route D559 which links Hyères (41 km) and Sainte-Maxime (12 km).

Historic sites
The ramparts (protecting walls that surround the city)
The rectory
The chapel Notre Dame de la Compassion
L'Androuno,  one of the world's narrowest streets

Personalities
Emmanuelle Béart, French actress.
Sarah Biasini, French actress, daughter of Romy Schneider
Inès de la Fressange, designer of fashion and perfumes
Mary Jayne Gold, American heiress who helped key figures escape Occupied France
David Ginola, ex-footballer and pundit
Sacha Opinel, ex-footballer
Arthur Rinderknech, tennis player

Activities
Walks
Varied water sports
An 18-hole golf course
A polo field and polo club
The oldest art gallery in the area, Galerie deï Barri

See also
Communes of the Var department

References

External links
Tourism website
Tourism website

Communes of Var (department)
Plus Beaux Villages de France